Didymaotus is a monotypic genus of flowering plant belonging to the family Aizoaceae, containing the single species Didymaotus lapidiformis. It occurs natively in the arid regions of Tanqua Karoo, near Ceres in the Western Cape. The generic name is taken from the Greek words didymos, meaning double, and aotus, meaning flower; the plant that bears two flowers. The specific epithet lapidiformis means stone-like, as it is not easily seen, blending in with its surroundings.

Conservation 
Didymaotus lapidiformis is considered vulnerable as a result of its localised and restricted habitat. Succulent collectors have over the years added to the species' further decline.

References

Further reading 
 Oliver, I.B. (2005). Grow succulents; Kirstenbosch Gardening Series. SANBI. 
 Stearn, W.T. (1998). Botanical Latin. 

Aizoaceae
Aizoaceae genera
 
Taxa named by N. E. Brown
Monotypic Caryophyllales genera